The following is a list of highest-grossing films in India, with gross revenue in Indian Rupees. This is an official tracking of figures, as reliable sources that publish data are frequently pressured to increase their estimates. Box office collections have been steadily increasing in the 21st century, the main reasons attributed to the rise in ticket prices, and increase in number of theatres and prints of a film.

Overview
The film broke a number of domestic records, grossing over 415 crore in its opening weekend.

The Indian market is dominated by domestic Indian films, which represented 85% of the country's box office revenue in 2015; this is the highest for a major film market after the United States, where domestic Hollywood films represent 88.8% of its box office revenue. While Indian films remain at the top of the domestic Indian box office, the market for Hollywood films has gradually been growing; the market share of foreign films rose from 8% in 2014 up to 15% in 2015, with Hollywood films representing 10% of the Indian market in 2016 and 13% in 2017. Some of the earliest foreign blockbusters in India included Mackenna's Gold (1969) starring Gregory Peck and Omar Sharif, and Bruce Lee's Hong Kong martial arts films Enter the Dragon (in 1975) and Way of the Dragon (in 1979).

Domestic gross figures

Nominal gross

Footfalls

Adjusted gross 
The following table lists adjusted gross figures, largely based on the data given by Box Office India, which calculates adjusted net figures by multiplying the footfalls of a film with the average ticket price (ATP) of the most recent year where ATP data is available. Adjusted gross figures are obtained by extrapolating adjusted net figures. The list is limited to films released from the year 1993 onwards, due to the paucity of reliable data for films released before that year. As Box Office India tracks only Hindi-language films, it is worth noting that adjusted gross figures of the films shot in other Indian languages like Telugu and Tamil may not feature in the list.

Highest-grossing openings in India 
This list charts films the 10 biggest openings in India. Since many films do not open on Fridays, the 'opening' is taken to be the gross between the first day of release and the first Sunday following the movie's release.

Timeline of gross records

Nominal gross

Adjusted gross

Foreign films

Highest-grossing films by year

See also
List of highest-grossing Indian films
List of highest-grossing Hindi films
List of highest-grossing South Indian films
List of highest-grossing Indian films in the overseas markets
100 Crore Club
1000 Crore Club

Notes

References

India
Cinema of India
Indian film-related lists